Iqbal Singh Jhundan (born January 2, 1962) is an Indian politician, and is the member of Shiromani Akali Dal. He has served as member of legislative assembly in Punjab from Dhuri (2007-2012) and from Amargarh (2012-2017). He is also the President of Shiromani Akali Dal district Sangrur.

References 

1962 births
Shiromani Akali Dal politicians
Living people